The Callao Square is located at the centre of the Spanish capital of Madrid.

History and description 
Shaped in 1861, the square was formally opened in June 1866; its name remembers the May 1866 battle of Callao between the Spanish naval forces under the command of Casto Méndez Núñez and the Peruvian army.

The square was substantially and aggressively reformed in the 21st century. The reform removed nearly all elements present by that time, except the metro station access and a big tree, turning the square into a pedestrian and homogeneous space, while adding a limited number of pieces of urban furniture. Conversely, big screens were added to the surrounding buildings. Located in a very commercial area of the city, the pedestrian space is often for rent to companies wanting to carry out advertising events.

See also 
 Piccadilly Circus
 Times Square
 Yonge-Dundas Square
 Shibuya

References 
Citations

Bibliography
 
 
 
 
 

Plazas in Centro District, Madrid
Sol neighborhood, Madrid